Harichandra is a 1968 Indian Tamil-language Hindu mythological film, directed by K. S. Prakash Rao and produced by G. Varalakshmi. The film stars Sivaji Ganesan and G. Varalakshmi. It was released on 11 April 1968.

Plot 
Harichandra is the ruler of Ayodhya belonging to Raghuvamsa. He has never lied to anyone and has always kept his word in his life which he values above everything else. Viswamithran challenges Rishi Vashista, who is the former's rival, that he will make Harichandra to lie or renege on his word. Vishwamitran demands Harichandra to give over his kingdom as he had promised him the same in his dream. Taking that the sage as revered as him would not bluff, Harichandra proceeds to hand it over and moves to Kasi. To give the mandatory salutary alms to be given to sages, considering that Harichandra now has nothing to give; Nachandra is sent by Vishwamitran to collect the same. Harichandra sells his wife and son to Kalakandan and pays the due but Nachandra asks for his fee for wasting his time. Harichandra sells himself to Veerabaghu and pays all the due.

Viswamithran tries various methods to make Harichandra suffer by contriving the death of his son as well as having his wife accused of murdering the prince forcing Harichandra to be the executioner. Harichandra however proceeds without saying a word against any one. In the end, Viswamithran accepts defeat and restores Harichandra to the throne.

Cast 
Cast according to the opening credits and the songbook:
Male cast
 Sivaji Ganesan as Harichandra Maharaja
 T. S. Balaiah as Veerabaghu
 K. A. Thangavelu as Nachandra Iyer
 M. N. Nambiar as Vishvamitran
 V. K. Ramasamy as Kalakandan
 O. A. K. Thevar as Kasiraja
 M. K. Mustafa as Minister
 Ajith Singh as Indran
 S. Rama Rao as Vishvamitran's disciple
 Master Anandan as Logidas
 R. Subbaraman as Hunter
 M. Balraj as Shivan
 Jothi Shanmugam
Female cast
 G. Varalakshmi as Chandramathi
 T. P. Muthulakshmi as Kalakandi
 Mohana as Veerabaghu's wife
 Sarala Devi as Parvathi
 Kanagasri
Dance
 E. V. Saroja
 Kusalakumari
 Gopi Krishna
 Sasi

Soundtrack 
Music was composed by K. V. Mahadevan and the lyrics were penned by Thanjai N. Ramaiah Dass & Udhayakumar.

References

External links 
 

1960s Tamil-language films
1968 films
Films directed by K. S. Prakash Rao
Films scored by K. V. Mahadevan
Hindu mythological films